The Legal functional constituency is a functional constituency in the elections for the Legislative Council of Hong Kong. It was the one of the first 12 original functional constituency seats created for the first ever Legislative Council election in 1985.

As of 2021, there were 7,549 registered voters, including the members of the Law Society of Hong Kong and the Hong Kong Bar Association, and the officers in the government's judicial departments. It is one of the few strongholds of the pro-democracy camp in functional constituencies, having been held by pro-democrats since 1995, was held by Civic Party's Dennis Kwok until he was disqualified from his office in 2020. Following electoral overhaul, the seat was controlled by the Beijing loyalist for the first time.

Composition
The Legal functional constituency is composed of—
 members of The Law Society of Hong Kong entitled to vote at general meetings of the Society; and
 members of the Hong Kong Bar Association entitled to vote at general meetings of the Association; and
 legal officers within the meaning of the Legal Officers Ordinance; and
 persons appointed under section 3 of the Legal Aid Ordinance (and
 persons deemed to be legal officers for the purpose of the Legal Officers Ordinance by section 75(3) of the Bankruptcy Ordinance or section 3(3) of the Director of Intellectual Property (Establishment) Ordinance; and
 the Legal Adviser of the Legislative Council Secretariat and his or her assistants who are in the full-time employment of The Legislative Council Commission and are barristers or solicitors as defined in the Legal Practitioners Ordinance.

Return members

Electoral results

2020s

2010s

2000s

1990s

1980s

References

Constituencies of Hong Kong
Constituencies of Hong Kong Legislative Council
Functional constituencies (Hong Kong)
1985 establishments in Hong Kong
Constituencies established in 1985